Juan Alban is a guitar player and the lead singer of Australian rock band Epicure. Alban currently resides in Ballarat, Victoria.

References

External links
 

Living people
Australian singer-songwriters
Australian rock guitarists
Year of birth missing (living people)
Australian male guitarists
Australian male singer-songwriters